Vasco Prado (Uruguaiana, April 16, 1914 – Porto Alegre, December 9, 1998) was a Brazilian sculptor and engraver.

References
 Encyclopedia of Latin American History and Culture

External links
 Vasco Prado

Brazilian sculptors
1914 births
1998 deaths
20th-century sculptors